The Insight Meditation Society (IMS) is a non-profit organization for study of Buddhism located in Barre, Massachusetts. It was founded in 1975, by Sharon Salzberg, Jack Kornfield, and Joseph Goldstein and is rooted in the Theravada tradition. Its first retreat center in an old mansion in Barre, Massachusetts was opened on February 14, 1976.

Overview
IMS offers Buddhist meditation retreats at two facilities – the Retreat Center and The Forest Refuge – in rural central Massachusetts. Both centers teach vipassanā.

From 1996-2006, IMS offered a correspondence course developed by its founders Joseph Goldstein and Sharon Salzberg entitled Insight Meditation which consisted of 12 audio cassettes and a workbook. The course later evolved into Insight Meditation: An In-Depth Correspondence Course, with 24 audio CDs and an 88-page workbook.

Vassa is a basic practice for Buddhist monastics. During this three-month retreat, monks seclude themselves and follow a tight regimen of meditation and dharma study. Every year, the Insight Meditation Society runs a three-month course that has been called the "marathon of meditation". Save for triweekly interviews with instructors and nightly lessons, the retreatants observe full silence. In Theravada tradition, after lunch, they do not eat another meal, but are allowed snacks and drink tea, which is not accepted by many Buddhists as proper practice. The center's courses provide instruction and practice in vipassanā or mettā meditations.

Teachings
When a Retreat Center course is in progress, anyone who is not already participating in the retreat is welcome to attend the evening talks about the teachings, known as dharma talks. Those with insight meditation experience are also welcome to attend group sittings." Dharma talks are available for free download, a service provided by Dharma Seed.

References

External links 
Official website 
 Dharma Talks given at Insight Meditation Society -Retreat Center
 Dharma Talks given at Insight Meditation Society -Forest Refuge

Buddhist organizations based in the United States
Theravada Buddhist orders
Organizations established in 1975
Buddhism in Massachusetts
Non-profit organizations based in Massachusetts
1975 establishments in Massachusetts
Barre, Massachusetts